Hesarak Bala is a neighborhood located in the northwest of Karaj, Iran and in District 6 of Karaj Municipality.

Geographical and urban location 
This neighborhood leads from the north to Sarbazan Gomnam Anonymous Boulevard, from the south to Shahid Beheshti Street (Qazvin Old Road), from the east to Qalam Street and from the west to Kharazmi Boulevard. Hesarak Bala is bounded on the west by Karaj (Pishhangi), on the east by Gohardasht neighborhood, on the north by Shahin Villa neighborhood, and on the south by Hesarak Pa'in neighborhood.

Ecology 
Hesarak Bala is culturally almost single-culturally defined and has cultural facilities and educational centers. Various schools and university centers, especially the Teacher Training College, have added to the development of the region's culture and social character. 
The people of the upper Hesarak are of different ethnicities and have a long history. Although the population of this region is composed of different ethnic groups, based on the antiquity and civilization of the land, a single culture can be seen. It can be said that most of the people of Hesarak are from the north and, of course, other ethnic groups in Iran, such as Yazdi, Kermani, Isfahani, etc., can also be seen. 
It can be said that Hesarak Bala area is one of the most suitable areas for living. What is more, this region has a temperate climate and the housing and land conditions are more suitable than other areas of Karaj. Due to the famous Hesarak Bazaar, the food and leeks of this region are the most important factor in choosing this region. 
The upper Hesarak area has a genuine, compassionate, emotional and sociable people, so that they appear well in social communication. Considering the change and evolution of social behaviors and manners that can be seen in Karaj city, it can be said that the people of this region have intellectual stability and superfluous masculinity, and of course, the stability of their behavior and social performance is admirable in many fields.
Director of the Sociology Department of the History Museum of Karaj

Scientific Research Centers 
'' 'Vaccine Research Institute and Razi Serum Making 'is the oldest institute active in the field of vaccine production in Iran. This institute is located in Hesarak Bala area of Alborz province Alborz]] Iran is located, producing more than three and a half billion doses of various biological products annually. 
The institute is located on the old Qazvin road, which has now been renamed [Shahid Beheshti Street] (Karaj). This route itself is part of the Silk Road, which is located between the cities of Qazvin and Rey. The institute has been used in  Qajar period as a treatment center for horses, horsemen, couriers and livestock. After the First World War, due to the Treaty of Turkmenchay, the deprived Qajar state suffered from famine and widespread infectious diseases in people and livestock. It became an animal and a cold in Iran ", which was later renamed" Razi Refrigeration Company "by the order of Reza Shah Kabir and then renamed to" Razi Vaccine and Serum Research Institute ". 
The center's initial activity focused on [cattle plague], but later expanded to produce a variety of vaccines and serums for medical and veterinary use. Following [World War II], the institute was occupied by [Red Army] forces for several years, and they built several military-based buildings at the institute. 
Kharazmi University is one of the state universities affiliated with the Iranian Ministry of Science, Research and Technology, named after the great Iranian scientist Mohammad bin Musa Kharazmi.
The university has been renamed several times and a campus has been added to it. Currently, Kharazmi University specializes in various fields Basic Sciences, Humanities, Educational Sciences and Engineering in various courses from Bachelor to  accepts students.
In 1312, the name of this university was changed from Teachers High School  to Higher Education University and in 1353 it was changed to Teacher Training University The renaming of this university to "Kharazmi University" was approved by the Ministry of Science's Higher Education Development Council in 1981 and 1982, and since February 2012, the university has been officially renamed "Kharazmi University".
The technical and engineering faculty of this university is always considered as one of the best faculties of Kharazmi University, so that in two years, 1397–98, it was selected as the best faculty of Kharazmi University.

Main streets and boulevards 
The main streets include Shahid Beheshti, Kharazmi, Ghalam, Anonymous Soldiers, Azadi, Imam Khomeini, Kaveh, Khoshboui, Khorasani, Mohammadi, and Sassanids.

Index places 
 kharazmi University
 Razi Vaccine and Serum Research Institute
 Shahid Rajaei Heart Hospital 
 Karaj Vocational Technical University 
 Kowsar Hospital 
 Alborz Mall Commercial Complex

References 

Karaj
Alborz (mountain range)